Leucoptera onobrychidella is a moth in the family Lyonetiidae. It is found from France to Poland and Hungary.

The larvae feed on Onobrychis arenaria, Onobrychis sativa and Onobrychis viciifolia. They mine the leaves of their host plant. The mine consists of a more or less oval, primary blotch with frass in concentric arcs. Pupation takes place outside of the mine.

External links
bladmineerders.nl
Fauna Europaea

Leucoptera (moth)
Moths of Europe